Flipper is a 1963 American adventure film written by Arthur Weiss based upon a story by Ricou Browning and Jack Cowden. Produced by Ivan Tors and directed by James B. Clark, the film centers on a 12-year-old boy living with his parents in the Florida Keys who befriends an injured wild dolphin. The boy and the dolphin become inseparable, eventually overcoming the misgivings of the boy's fisherman father.

Released by Metro-Goldwyn-Mayer on August 14, 1963, the film introduced the popular song Flipper by Dunham and Henry Vars. It was a surprise hit at the box office and inspired the subsequent television series of the same name (1964–1967) and film sequels.

Plot 
Sandy Ricks is a young boy living in the Florida Keys who rescues and befriends a dolphin injured by a harpoon. His father, fisherman Porter Ricks disapproves, as dolphins compete for fish, which jeopardizes the family income. He is also upset that, after befriending the dolphin, Sandy neglects his chores, especially those assigned by Porter to repair items damaged by the hurricane from which Sandy and Porter escape at the beginning of the film.

Sandy names the dolphin Flipper, and Flipper recovers from the wound and puts on a show to entertain the neighborhood children. Porter, seeing Flipper as both a threat to his nets and fish and a distraction to Sandy's chores, lets the recovered Flipper swim out of the pen to the open sea, despite Sandy's tearful plea to keep the pet that he has come to love.

Flipper returns to the Ricks' pen, much to Sandy's delight, but devours Porter's entire catch of pompano, which were caught only because Flipper guided Sandy to the fish. The loss is keenly felt because of a red plague killing local fish in large numbers. Porter harshly berates Sandy for allowing Flipper to jump into the holding pen of valuable fish waiting to go to market. Reduced to tears, Sandy retreats to his bedroom as Porter's wife Martha reminds Porter that Sandy is just a child.

Determined to make up for the loss, Sandy sets off to find more fish, and is led by Flipper to a large school of fish near a reef. Later, Sandy is rescued from a threatening shark by Flipper, and the grateful father draws closer to his son. Porter is finally convinced that Flipper did indeed help Sandy find fish and that there are enough fish for the local residents as well as the dolphins.

Cast 
 Chuck Connors as Porter Ricks
 Luke Halpin as Sandy Ricks
 Kathleen Maguire as Martha Ricks
 Connie Scott as Kim Parker
 Jane Rose as Hettie White
 Joe Higgins as Mr. L. C. Parett
 Robertson White as  Mr. Abrams
 George Applewhite as Sheriff Rogers
 Sharon Roberts (Bertram) as pretty girl by water and Sabrina's mom

Production 
Co-creator Ricou Browning said that he originally conceived the story after seeing his children intently watching the TV series Lassie, which inspired Browning to create a similar story with a dolphin in place of the dog. After he sent the story to his friend, producer Ivan Tors, Tors expressed interest in making it into a film.

Filmed in color in 1962 and released in 1963, Flipper has several underwater sequences, along with scenes of the trained dolphin performing stunts. Flipper was actually Mitzie (1958–1972), a female trained at the Santini Porpoise School (later the Dolphin Research Center) by Milton and Virginia Santini, who are credited in the film. Mitzie is buried at the Dolphin Research Center, where her grave is the first stop on the center's public tours.

In addition to Mitzie, four other dolphins were filmed for the production of the movie. Two of the dolphins, Little Bit, a female, and Mr. Gipper, a male, mated at the Santini Porpoise School, yielding a calf named Tursi in 1973 who still lives at the Dolphin Research Center.

Sequels 
A film sequel, Flipper's New Adventure, was filmed in late 1963 and released in June 1964. That same year, a television series inspired by the movie, also titled Flipper, began and ran until 1967. A 1990s television revival featured Jessica Alba. In 1996, a movie remake was released, starring Paul Hogan and Elijah Wood.

See also 
 List of American films of 1963

References

External links 
 
 

1963 films
1963 adventure films
American children's adventure films
Films about dolphins
Films adapted into television shows
Films directed by James B. Clark
Films shot in Florida
Metro-Goldwyn-Mayer films
1960s children's adventure films
1960s English-language films
1960s American films